The JE is a light commercial all-electric vehicle from the British-based Morris Commercial company. The retro-styled van is based on the 1949 Morris Commercial J-type and was first announced in 2017.

The JE was formally unveiled on 13 November 2019, with production announced to commence in 2021 with an expected price of around £60,000.

Specifications
The JE is powered by a rear-mounted electric motor and a 60kWh lithium-ion battery pack. The battery has 60kWh rapid charging capability and is claimed to have a range of around 200 miles.

The JE has a payload of 1000kg and a 2.5-tonne gross weight.

It has been designed and developed on Worcestershire, but the location of production has not yet been unveiled. The company aims to produce 1000 a year.

Based on a drive train of a Nissan LEAF. A glimpse of Leaf's dashboard can be seen in one of the videos also start button visible in BBC "Road travel show" - Wales episode

References

External links

Electric vans